Colston Loveland (born April 9, 2004) is an American football tight end for the Michigan Wolverines. An Idaho native, he joined Michigan as an early enrollee in January 2022.

Early years and high school career
Loveland was born in 2004. He attended Gooding High School in Gooding, Idaho, where he starred in basketball and football. He caught 235 passes (91 as a senior) for 3,141 yards and 35 touchdowns at Gooding. As a senior in 2021, he was rated as the No. 1 player in Idaho and won the Gatorade Idaho Player of the Year award. He received offers from Michigan, Alabama, LSU, Auburn, Utah, Oregon State, Arizona State, Nevada, Idaho, Idaho State, and Utah State.

College career
In July 2021, Loveland committed to play college football at Michigan. He graduated early and enrolled at Michigan in January 2022 as an early enrollee. He appeared in his first game for Michigan on September 3, 2022, and had two receptions for 18 yards. In the 2022 regular season, Loveland had 11 receptions for 174 yards. Against Ohio State, he caught a 45-yard pass at the beginning of the third quarter for his first collegiate touchdown.

Statistics

References

External links
 Michigan Wolverines bio

2004 births
Living people
American football tight ends
Michigan Wolverines football players
People from Gooding, Idaho
Players of American football from Idaho